Safe & Sound is the first full-length studio album by American pop-punk band Juneau, released January 24, 2006 on Red Letter Records. The album was re-released as a special edition in June 2006 with the bonus track "Bittersweet Surprise" included.

Track listing
 "Home" - 1:27
 "Guardian Angel" - 5:15
 "Secrets" - 3:44
 "The New Romantics" - 4:33
 "Now Boarding" - 4:45
 "Aesthetic" - 1:30
 "Say Goodnight" - 6:22
 "Northern Lights"3:12
 "Save Yourself" - 3:43
 "Safe and Sound" - 6:33
 "Bittersweet Surprise" - 6:19 (Special Edition only)

Personnel
Justin Schultze - lead vocals & guitar
Kyle Jones - backing vocals & bass
Jordan Schultze - drums, percussion
Joshua Neal - piano
Aubrey McCoy - backing vocals on "Bittersweet Surprise"

References

2006 albums
Juneau (band) albums